Peters' rock gecko (Pristurus longipes) is a species of lizard in the Sphaerodactylidae family found in Yemen.

References

Pristurus
Reptiles described in 1871
Taxa named by Wilhelm Peters